Grasshopper Scouts (Chinese: 小童軍), Grasshopper Section, or simply Grasshopper, is a Scout section of The Scout Association of Hong Kong in Hong Kong for 5 to 8-year-old boys and girls. Established in 1985, it is modeled after Beaver Scouts in the United Kingdom. It is the youngest section in Hong Kong Scouting and the second largest section after the Cub Scout Section.

Grasshopper Scout units are designated as "rings". When member reaches the age of 7½, they can be promoted into Cub Scouts. Members wear the World Scout emblem and are formal members of the World Organization of the Scout Movement.

History
In a rapidly changing Hong Kong society, the Hong Kong Scouting Association reviewed Scout programmes and, in 1982, began a reform programme named Project Rainbow (天虹計劃).  The reform was based on the experience of the Scout Association in the United Kingdom, the closest system to Hong Kong Scouting. Several tenets of the UK programme were adopted by the Hong Kong association, including extending the age of Scouting, adoption of female members and establishment of a section for six- to eight-year-olds.

The establishment of the Grasshopper Scout programme came to reality in 1985 with twelve scout groups participating in the experimental programme. The adoption of female members began in 1986. The programme proved successful and became the fifth Section in Hong Kong Scouting.

In 1987, the Hong Kong Scouting Association published the first programme guide for the section. A para-balloon (快樂傘) was selected as the symbol of the Section and a major tool in Grasshopper Scout meetings. The progressive training system, similar to  other sections, was established at the same time.

Promise, law, yell and motto
'The promise'
"I promise to be a Grasshopper Scout, to love God, to love people and to love my country" (in Chinese: 我願參加小童軍，愛神愛人愛國家).

Before 12 January 2001, the words Country and 國家 were Hong Kong and 香港 respectively.

'The Law'
"A Grasshopper Scout does a good turn every day" (in Chinese: 小童軍日行一善).

'The Yell'
"A Grasshopper Scout Goes Forward" (in Chinese: 小童軍向前進).

'The Motto'
"Forward" (in Chinese: 前進).

Ceremonies
Grasshopper Scout sections have no formal ceremonies. Every ceremony is simple, serious and short. The most important ceremony is the induction ceremony. Other common ceremonies conducted at the meetings include a welcome ceremony, a goodbye ceremony, presentation of progressive badges, welcoming of guests, special events (such as an anniversary ceremony), departure from the Grasshopper Scout ring and promotion to the Cub Scout pack. Because children between six and eight years of age cannot concentrate for extended periods of time, Grasshopper Scout ceremonies should not take longer than five minutes.

The association suggests that, when inducting new members, three to four new members should be inducted together and no member should be inducted individually.

Organisation
Most Grosshopper rings are organised by primary schools and the community centres of NGOs in Hong Kong. Some Scout groups also establish independent sections.

A ring is run by a Grasshopper scout leader with the help of assistant leaders and instructors. It is part of a Scout group that might have other sections like Cub Scout, Scout, Venture Scout and Rover Scout. Generally, each ring meets once a week for an hour. As in all scouting programmes, Grasshopper Scouting is fun and a large part of training is done through games.

Badges
Four progressive badges are designated for the section programme to encourage members' active participation. They are square badges with four footprints coloured red, brown, blue and green progressively. The badges are awarded according to the number of hours that members have participated.

Uniform
The official Grasshopper Scouting uniform consists of only a group scarf. However, most rings also design their own T-shirts for the sake of uniformity. Badges of different kinds can be attached to the T-shirts.

See also

Beavers (Scouting)
Beaver Scouts (The Scout Association)
Beaver Scouts (Scouting Ireland)

External links
Grasshopper Scouts (in Chinese)
Leaders and Sections

Scouting and Guiding in Hong Kong